Eburodacrys superba is a species of beetle in the family Cerambycidae. It was described by Napp and Martins in 1980.

References

Eburodacrys
Beetles described in 1980